Visions of the Seeker is the second studio album by Angband, the power metal/progressive metal musical group, released on October 29, 2010, through Pure Steel Records. The album was mixed and mastered by the veteran producer/sound engineer Achim Kohler. The video clip for the song "Forsaken Dreams" was released in November 2011.

Track listing

Reception 
The Lords of Metal webzine noticed the band's slight progress in songwriting, as well as their musicianship. It commented that "the album also shows a highly talented band that, thanks to their background, have also managed to come up with a sound of their own."

Personnel 
 Mahyar Dean - electric guitar
 Ashkan Yazdani - vocals
 Ramin Rahimi - drums
 M. Halaji - bass guitar
 Produced by Mahyar Dean
 Rhythm guitars engineered and recorded by Mahyar Dean
 Other instruments and vocals engineered by Omid Nik Bin
 Recorded at Rahgozar Studio, Tehran
 Mixed and mastered at Indiscreet Audio studio
 Engineered by Achim Kohler
 Cover art by Maziar Dean

External links 

Angband at Facebook
Angband at Last.fm
Pure Steel Records

References 

2010 albums
Angband (band) albums